General John Hall (1799 – 5 May 1872) was a British Conservative Party politician. He was elected unopposed as one of the two Members of Parliament (MPs) for Buckingham at a by-election January 1846, and was returned at the next three elections until he stood down from the House of Commons at the 1859 general election.

He belonged to the Hall family of Weston Colville, Cambridgeshire, his father being John Hall (1767–1860). In the 1860s, the family moved within the county to Six Mile Bottom, to an estate that passed to General John Hall's nephew on his death without issue.

Hall entered the British Army in 1817, becoming a lieutenant-colonel in the 1st Life Guards in 1837, and major-general in 1855.

References

External links 
 

1799 births
1872 deaths
Conservative Party (UK) MPs for English constituencies
UK MPs 1841–1847
UK MPs 1847–1852
UK MPs 1852–1857
UK MPs 1857–1859